Listemus is a genus of pill beetles in the family Byrrhidae. There are at least four described species in Listemus.

Species
These four species belong to the genus Listemus:
 Listemus acuminatus (Mannerheim, 1852)
 Listemus formosus Casey, 1912
 Listemus kootenai Johnson, 1991
 Listemus satelles Casey

References

Further reading

 
 
 

Byrrhidae
Articles created by Qbugbot